Ella Cheever Thayer (September 14, 1849 – October 28, 1925) was an American playwright and novelist. Born in Maine, she worked as a telegraph operator and published several works in her lifetime.

Biography
She was the daughter of apothecary George Augusta Thayer (October 19, 1824 – December 13, 1863) and Rachel Ella Cheever Thayer (October 18, 1823 - May 15, 1907). One sister, Mary Georgie Thayer (October 9, 1869 – March 30, 1912), was a school teacher. Thayer eventually became a telegraph operator at the Brunswick Hotel in Boston, Massachusetts, who used her experience on the telegraph as the basis for her book Wired Love, A Romance of Dots and Dashes, which became a bestseller for 10 years.

She was also a playwright, having written The Lords of Creation in 1883. Her play is reviewed in the book On to Victory: Propaganda Plays of the Woman's Suffrage Movement by Bettina Friedl, published in 1990 and it was one of the first suffragette plays.

She also wrote Amber, a Daughter of Bohemia, a drama in five acts, in 1883. She also wrote short stories for magazines including "The Forgotten Past" in Argosy (January 1897).

Later life and death 
She lived in Saugus, Massachusetts. Thayer died of liver cancer; her ashes were placed on November 1, 1925 in Bigelow Chapel, Mount Auburn Cemetery, Cambridge, Middlesex County, Massachusetts.

References

External links 

 
 
 
 

1849 births
1925 deaths
Writers from Portland, Maine
People from Saugus, Massachusetts
19th-century American novelists
American women novelists
American women short story writers
American women dramatists and playwrights
19th-century American women writers
19th-century American short story writers
Hello Girls
Novelists from Maine